A Political Romance is a 1759 novel by Laurence Sterne, author of Tristram Shandy.

The novel was the first work written by Sterne, and it can be labelled a roman à clef or a cronique scandaleuse, which were popular at the beginning of the 18th century. It can be considered a mock-epic allegory that describes a provincial squabble between a church-lawyer, an archbishop and a Dean, i.e. a "Lilliputian" satire on ecclesiastical politics in Sterne's York.

The publishing history of Sterne's work
As Sterne's biographer W. L. Cross reports, until the beginning of the last century the only version of A Political Romance available to readers and critics, once it was suppressed soon after its publication in 1759, was the mutilated version reprinted in 1769 (after Sterne's death)' The title of that version was The History of a Good Warm Watch-Coat. But in September 1905 an original and unexpected copy was found in the library of the dean and chapter of York. Since then, another five original copies have been found. And what the finders found was that the 1769 publisher, further to making the humorist's language suitable, also cut off the last three parts of the text, i.e., half the work. In 1914 then, when A Political Romance was published by the Club of Odd Volumes, only those few fortunate readers could read, further to The History of a Good Warm Watch-Coat, the "Key" and the two final letters, the first addressed to the publisher, the second to the target of the satire.

The History of a Good Warm Watch-Coat is available in The Works of Laurence Sterne, published in 1769.

References

External links

18th-century British novels
1759 novels
Novels by Laurence Sterne
Novels set in York
British political novels
1759 debut novels